Choe Yong-gon (11 December 1951 – May 2015) was one of the vice-premiers of North Korea and deputy minister of construction and building material industries. He appears to have disappeared from public life after December 2014. In August 2015, South Korea's Yonhap News Agency reported that, according to a "source who demanded anonymity", he is believed to have been executed in May 2015 after opposing the policies of North Korea's leader Kim Jong-un on forestry. He was 63.

References 

Prisoners and detainees of North Korea
People executed for treason against North Korea
Executed politicians
Purges in North Korea
21st-century executions by North Korea
Executed North Korean people
Government ministers of North Korea
Date of death missing
1951 births
2015 deaths
People from Kangwon Province (North Korea)